Gymnothorax reticularis is a moray eel found in the western Pacific and Indian Oceans. A single specimen was reported in 2013 in the Mediterranean Sea off Israel.
It was first named by Marcus Elieser Bloch in 1795, and is commonly known as the dusky-banded moray, reticulated moray, net moray, or the spotted moray.

References

reticularis
Fish of the Indian Ocean
Fish of the Pacific Ocean
Fish described in 1795
Taxa named by Marcus Elieser Bloch